Larry Carwell (August 5, 1944 – January 10, 1984) was an American college and professional football player.  A cornerback, he played college football at Iowa State University, and played professionally in the American Football League (AFL) for the Houston Oilers in 1967 and 1968 and the Boston Patriots in 1969.  He continued to play for the NFL Boston Patriots and later the NFL New England Patriots from 1970 through 1972.

In 1984, he was a United States Drug Enforcement Administration officer working to stop the flow of marijuana and cocaine into the United States from Latin America. While aboard a U.S. helicopter bound for the Bahamas, he was one of five missing persons lost at sea when the helicopter crashed.

See also
List of American Football League players

1944 births
1984 deaths
American football cornerbacks
Iowa State Cyclones football players
Houston Oilers players
Boston Patriots players
New England Patriots players
Drug Enforcement Administration agents
American Football League players
People lost at sea
Victims of helicopter accidents or incidents in the United States